Dependent and Happy is the third studio album by Ricardo Villalobos. It was released by Perlon on LP and CD over three dates in August and September, 2012. The album is Villalobos' first solo studio album since 2004's Thé au Harem d'Archimède; several previous albums have either been DJ mixes (2007's fabric36), compilations (2006's Salvador and 2008's Vasco) or collaborations (2011's Re:ECM, with Max Loderbauer.)

Dependent and Happy was originally issued as five LP set, released in three parts: part one contained sides A-D; part two, sides E-H; and part three, sides I and J, a single vinyl release. Parts one and two were released on August 29, 2012, while part three followed on September 5. The CD pressing was released two weeks later, on September 19. The CD omits three songs and combines the remaining eleven songs into a DJ mix by Villalobos himself. Neither pressing will be issued digitally.

In October 2012, Villalobos released a fourth part of the album on vinyl, containing two additional songs and upping the album to a six LP set. Originally limited to 300 copies available only at Perlon pop-up stores, this fourth part has been repressed for wide release as of February 23, 2013. Both tracks are listed as sides K and L below.

"Koito" heavily samples "(Holon) Slo Motion" by Atom Heart, while "Two Kids Set Off" notably includes interviews and phonecalls related to the Columbine High School massacre.

Track listing
CD pressing

Vinyl pressing
Dependent and Happy - One

Dependent and Happy - Two

Dependent and Happy - Three

Dependent and Happy - Four

Credits
 Ricardo Villalobos - writer, producer, main performer
 Max Loderbauer - additional production on "Grumax", "Die Schwarze Massai" and "Samma"
 Atom Heart - additional production on "Koito"
 Andrew Gillings – vocals on "Put Your Lips"
 Oliver Weidenthaler - chair solo on "Put Your Lips"
 Rashad Becker - mastering
 Double Standard - sleeve artwork

References

2012 albums
Ricardo Villalobos albums